Wang Yong (王勇; Beijing, 1964) is a Chinese rock and world music musician. He trained as a guzheng player. In 1996 he issued his best-known album Samsara (往生).

References

1964 births
Living people
Chinese rock musicians
Musicians from Beijing
Date of birth missing (living people)